Sarah Belchetz-Swenson (May 24, 1938 - September 12, 2021) was a painter, printmaker, and portraitist.

Belchetz-Swenson was born in Cairo, Egypt in 1938 and grew up in Larchmont, New York. She joined the Art Students League in New York at thirteen and majored in studio art at Oberlin College, focusing on modern and historical painting and printing techniques. She briefly engaged with the New York art scene, supported by fellow artists, including her cousin Rudolf Baranik (who wrote the introduction to her Holocaust memorial Revisions) and the feminist painter May Stevens. She later moved to Johnson, Vermont with her husband, Victor Swenson and their two daughters. Following a divorce in the early 1990s, she settled in Williamsburg, Massachusetts.

Rites, Belchetz-Swenson's most widely-exhibited work, is a series of fourteen paintings, four monotypes, and four lithographs, linking scenes from the lives of contemporary women and girls with images from the Villa of the Mysteries in Pompeii.

References 

1938 births
2021 deaths
21st-century American women artists
21st-century American painters
20th-century American women artists
20th-century American painters
20th-century American printmakers
21st-century American printmakers
People from Larchmont, New York
Art Students League of New York alumni
Oberlin College alumni
American Jews
Jewish painters
People from Johnson, Vermont
People from Williamsburg, Massachusetts